Reebok/Dolphin & Youth is a Volvo Ocean 60 yacht. She finished eighth in the W60 class of the 1993–94 Whitbread Round the World Race skippered by Matt Humphries.

References

Volvo Ocean Race yachts
Sailing yachts of the United Kingdom
Volvo Ocean 60 yachts
1990s sailing yachts